The 2007 Auburn Tigers football team represented Auburn University during the 2007 NCAA Division I FBS football season. Head coach Tommy Tuberville returned for his ninth season at Auburn, the third longest tenure among SEC head coaches in 2007. He was joined by returning offensive coordinator Al Borges and returning defensive coordinator Will Muschamp. Auburn played its eight-game home schedule at Jordan–Hare Stadium, the ninth largest on-campus stadium in the NCAA in 2007, seating 87,451. Conference foe Vanderbilt returned to the schedule while non-conference opponents South Florida and Tennessee Tech played the Tigers for the first time. The Tigers finished the season ranked #14 in the Coaches Poll and #15 in the AP Poll.

Pre-season

Senior quarterback Brandon Cox returned for his third and final season as a starter, finally healthy after being hampered the entire 2006 season with injuries. Cox was joined in the backfield by a stable of talented backs including Brad Lester, Ben Tate and freshman Mario Fannin.

Auburn returned one of the best defensive lines in the SEC, if not the country, anchored by senior nose tackle Josh Thompson (43 tackles), senior defensive end and sack-leader Quentin Groves, and sophomore(RS) sensation Sen'Derrick Marks, who moved to end from defensive tackle.

Auburn was the first SEC school to install an HD video display and the second in the NCAA (after Texas' Godzillatron).

Preseason rankings
Auburn was ranked #14 in the initial USA Today Coaches Poll, a component of the Bowl Championship Series, released on August 3, 2007. Auburn's initial position in the AP poll was #18. Other preseason rankings for Auburn include:

# 11 – CBS SportsLine# 12 – Rivals.com# 12 – CollegeTOP25.com# 14 – College Football News# 16 – Sports Illustrated# 16 – ESPN
# 16 – Sporting News# 16 – NationalChamps.net# 17 – Congrove# 21 – Athlon Sports# 23 – Lindy's Sports

Watchlists and honors

Outland Trophy watchlist – King Dunlap
Bronko Nagurski Trophy watchlist – Quentin Groves
Chuck Bednarik Award watchlist – Quentin Groves
Ted Hendricks Award watchlist – Quentin Groves
Manning Award watchlist – Brandon Cox

Pre-season All-SEC Team
Coaches First Team, Defense – Quentin Groves (DE)
Media Days First Team, Defense – Quentin Groves (DE)
Coaches Second Team, Defense – Jonathan Wilhite (CB)
Media Days Second Team, Offense – King Dunlap (OL)
Media Days Second Team, Defense – Jonathan Wilhite (CB)
Coaches Third Team, Offense – King Dunlap, Brad Lester (RB)
Coaches Third Team, Defense – Josh Thompson (NT), Eric Brock (S), Patrick Lee (CB)

Schedule
The 2007 Tigers schedule was ranked the 5th hardest in the country by Sports Illustrated and 6th hardest by ESPN. The road schedule with all four opponents finishing in the Top 25 in 2006 including the defending BCS champion Florida Gators, was ranked as the 2nd toughest.

Post-season, Auburn's schedule difficulty was ranked #23 by the NCAA and #35 by Jeff Sagarin. Seven teams from Auburn's regular season schedule qualified for post-season bowls, with four winning their respective bowl including Sugar Bowl winner Georgia and BCS National Champion LSU.

Coaching staff

*Entering season

Game summaries

Kansas State

Brandon Cox threw a three-yard touchdown pass to tight end Gabe McKenzie with 2:01 remaining in the fourth quarter, then Antonio Coleman returned a recovered fumble 34 yards 50 seconds later for another touchdown and Auburn defeated Kansas State in the season opener for both teams. The Tigers trailed 13–9 heading into the fourth quarter, as Auburn's running game was held to only 62 yards. Cox completed 17 passes in 30 attempts for 229 yards and the decisive touchdown pass. Freshman place-kicker Wes Byrum kicked field goals of 20, 39 and 31 yards in his college debut.

Auburn had won the only two previous meetings with Kansas State in 1978 and 1979, and continued that tradition with a tough win in the home opener against the Wildcats.
SEC Defensive Lineman Of The Week: Quentin Groves

USF

This was Auburn's first game against the Big East's USF Bulls,  and it was a memorable night for the Bulls.  Quarterback Matt Grothe threw a 14-yard touchdown pass to receiver Jesse Hester in overtime to lead USF to a 26–23 upset win over Auburn. The Tigers committed five turnovers-three lost fumbles and two passes thrown for interceptions-as the Bulls won their first-ever game against a team from the Southeastern Conference.

USF led 14–3 after the first quarter, but Auburn scored two touchdowns in the second quarter on a four-yard run by freshman tailback Mario Fannin and a three-yard pass reception by Gabe McKenzie to take a 17–14 halftime lead. South Florida place kicker Delbert Alvarado, who had missed four field goal attempts in the second half, kicked an 18-yard field goal with less than a minute remaining in the fourth quarter to tie the game and force overtime.  
Lou Groza Star of the Week: Wes Byrum

Mississippi State

In a game that would see the Tigers turn the ball over five times, and their starting quarterback benched in favor of a true freshman, Auburn fell to the Bulldogs despite outgaining them by 110 yards. Mississippi State last won at Auburn in 1999 as Auburn leads the series at home 25–5 and 56–22–2 overall.

New Mexico State

The Aggies lost to the Tigers in the teams' only previous meeting in 1993.
SEC Special Teams Player Of The Week: Josh Hebert & Patrick Tatum

Florida

Auburn made its first trip to The Swamp since 2002. Auburn's defeat of Florida was the Gators' only loss in their 2006 BCS Championship season, and the Tigers pulled an upset again in 2007 over then #3 ranked Gators. With the win, Auburn increased their lead in the overall series (42–38–2) and Tommy Tuberville coached Auburn teams now hold a 3–0 record versus Florida when the Gators are ranked in the Top 5.

Wes Byrum's game-winning field goal as time expired was named the ESPN Game-Changing Performance of the Week.
SEC Defensive Player of the Week: Jerraud Powers
SEC Special Teams Player of the Week: Wes Byrum
Lou Groza Star of the Week: Wes Byrum

Vanderbilt

The Tigers scored touchdowns on their first three possessions of the game and led 28–0 at halftime while coasting to an easy 35–7 victory over the visiting Commodores. Sophomore running back Ben Tate led the Tigers with 96 rushing yards, while Brad Lester, seeing his first game action since the 2006 Iron Bowl victory over Alabama, scored two touchdowns and rushed for 77 yards. Quarterback Brandon Cox completed 14 of 17 passing attempts for 165 yards for the Tigers, who improved to 2–1 in conference play and 4–2 overall.
 
The Commodores rotated back onto Auburn's schedule for the first meeting since 2003. After the victory, Auburn's all-time record against Vanderbilt is now 20–19–1. While the win marked the Tigers first lead in the series in 113 years, Auburn has not lost to the Commodores since 1955 when they met in the Gator Bowl. Auburn wore all-white uniforms at home for this game and removed the traditional AU logo from their helmets to honor the 50th anniversary of the 1957 National Championship team. The win marked Tommy Tuberville's 100th career win.

Arkansas

For the second time in three weeks, freshman kicker Wes Byrum kicked the winning field goal in the final minute of play as the 22nd-ranked Tigers defeated the Razorbacks 9–7. Byrum's three field goals accounted for all nine of Auburn's points as the Tigers won their fourth consecutive game and avenged a 27–10 loss to the Razorbacks in 2006 at Jordan–Hare Stadium. The Tigers' defense limited Arkansas running back Darren McFadden to 43 yards rushing.

Auburn scored the first six points of the game, as Wes Byrum kicked 22- and 38-yard field goals in the first and fourth quarter, but the Razorbacks went ahead with 1:36 remaining in the fourth quarter on an 11-yard touchdown pass from Casey Dick to Lucas Miller and a successful point after touchdown by Alex Tejada. Auburn returned the ensuing kickoff to their own 47 yard line. The go-ahead drive was highlighted by a 30-yard pass from senior quarterback Brandon Cox to wide receiver Robert Dunn. Byrum, who had missed field goal attempts in the third and fourth quarter, kicked the winning field goal with 21 seconds left in the game.
SEC Defensive Player of the Week: Tray Blackmon
Lou Groza Star of the Week: Wes Byrum

LSU

In a game that went back and forth between both teams, LSU quarterback Matt Flynn completed a touchdown pass to Demetrius Byrd at the last second to give LSU a 30–24 win.

Auburn has scored only five wins in eighteen attempts at tough Tiger Stadium, the last coming in Tuberville's first year at Auburn (1999). The stakes were high, as this game was a key matchup for a berth in the SEC Championship Game. The loss brings the series to 19–21–1 in favor of LSU. LSU went on to win the BCS National Championship game finishing #1 in the polls.

Ole Miss

Ole Miss has only beaten the Tigers in Auburn twice, in 1999 and in 2003; Auburn leads the series 24–8 after the 17–3 victory. 
SEC Defensive Lineman Of The Week: Antonio Coleman

Tennessee Tech

The Tennessee Tech Golden Eagles traveled to Auburn to meet the home-standing Tigers for the first time. Tech was greeted by Auburn's own golden eagle, Nova – War Eagle VII, who circled the field prior to the game in one of college football's most exciting traditions.

Georgia

AU traveled to Georgia for the 111th meeting of the Deep South's Oldest Rivalry. The Tigers suffered a 20+ loss for the second straight year but Auburn still leads the series in Athens 18–10 and has won 10 of the last 13 matchups in Sanford Stadium. The second consecutive loss by the Tigers continued a trend in the series where each team would win two years in a row followed by two consecutive losses – this behavior dates back to 1999–2001 when Auburn won three straight. Georgia finished the season ranked #2 in the AP Poll.

Alabama 

Auburn won the game 17–10, bringing the current winning streak to 6 (the longest in school history). Though this in-state rivalry known as the Iron Bowl is considered one of the most bitter and intense in all of sports with 72 matchups over the years, this was only the ninth meeting at Auburn's Jordan–Hare Stadium and the first meeting at JHS on Thanksgiving weekend.
SEC Defensive Lineman Of The Week: Josh Thompson

Rankings

Depth chart
Starters and backups.

Post-season

Auburn's 8-win regular season qualified a post-season bowl and the Tigers were selected by the Chick-fil-A Bowl to face the ACC's Clemson Tigers, with both teams' defenses being ranked in the top 10. Auburn changed their offense for this game, moving to new offensive coordinator Tony Franklin's spread offense in eight practices.  Auburn won the game in overtime with a 7-yard touchdown run by quarterback Kodi Burns. The 23–20 victory in 2007 was the first Peach Bowl to require overtime and Auburn now has a 3–1 record in the bowl. This bowl appearance marked Auburn's eighth consecutive appearance; the second longest streak in school history behind the 9-year stretch from 1982–1990.

National awards
Broyles Award Finalist – Will Muschamp (DC)

Freshman All-Americans

Conference awards
Associated Press All-SEC Team
First Team – Pat Sims (DT)
Second Team – Quentin Groves (DE), Ryan Shoemaker (P), Patrick Lee (CB)
Coaches' All-SEC
First Team – Quentin Groves (DE)
Second Team – Ryan Shoemaker (P)
Coaches' All-SEC Freshman Team – Ryan Pugh (OL), Chaz Ramsey (OL), Lee Ziemba (OL), Antoine Carter (DE), Zac Etheridge (S), Ryan Shoemaker (P)

Coaching changes
Following the close of the regular season, head coach Tommy Tuberville was offered a two-year contract extension that was verbally accepted on December 4, 2007. One week later, offensive coordinator Al Borges announced his resignation following a meeting late the previous week with Tuberville. On December 12, Auburn announced Tony Franklin, the offensive coordinator for the Troy Trojans, as Borges' replacement. With only 8 days of practice prior to the bowl, the new spread offense proved quite effective as Auburn posted 423 yards of offense (233 passing / 190 rushing), besting their season average in all offensive categories despite playing against the #6 defense in the nation.

Days following the Chick-fil-A Bowl, defensive coordinator Will Muschamp interviewed for and accepted the vacant defensive coordinator position with the Texas Longhorns. On January 17, 2008, Auburn named Pittsburgh's Paul Rhoads as the new defensive coordinator.

References

Auburn
Auburn Tigers football seasons
Peach Bowl champion seasons
Auburn Tigers football